William Gibson: A Literary Companion is a 2011 book by Tom Henthorne, published by McFarland & Company, focused on analyzing the works of American science-fiction writer William Gibson.

References

2011 non-fiction books
William Gibson